Max Hagmayr (born 16 November 1956) is a retired football striker from Austria. During his club career, Hagmayr played for VÖEST Linz, Karlsruher SC, Rapid Wien and LASK Linz.

References

External links
 

1956 births
Living people
Austrian footballers
Austria international footballers
Association football forwards
1982 FIFA World Cup players
LASK players
SK Rapid Wien players
Austrian Football Bundesliga players
Bundesliga players
Austrian football managers
LASK managers
People from Wels
Footballers from Upper Austria
Austrian expatriate sportspeople in West Germany
Austrian expatriate footballers
Expatriate footballers in West Germany